Vasyl Koval (Василь Коваль 17 January 1988) is a cross-country skier from Ukraine.

Performances

References

External links

1988 births
Living people
Ukrainian male cross-country skiers